Big Brother 2015 (also being marketed as Big Brother PM by the network) is the fourth regular season of Big Brother México, aired by Televisa through Canal 5. This is the show's revival in the country after being off the air for ten years, and its executive producer is Miguel Angel Fox, one of the country's most recognized television producers. As soon as the announcement of the new season was made in June 2015, castings began both online and through open calls that took place between June and August 2015 all over Mexico.

After much speculation, on September 10, 2015 it was announced that Season 1 host Adela Micha will return to host Big Brother México and the premiered on September 21, 2015 on Canal 5. As they did with the first instalment, Sky will once again provide the 24/7 live coverage of the house.

Format
According to Fox, this season is going to be a more ambitious project than it's ever been before. When asked by reporters about what will be the difference between this updated version of the show versus the ones aired more than ten years ago, Fox states that for this season all challenges will mix extreme and environmental-friendly elements, that it'll be a more psychological experience and also the interaction with viewers with social media.

Housemates
During the press conference held to announce the show, its executive producer, Miguel Ángel Fox, confirmed that a total of 15 contestants will enter the house. Casting calls began on July 11, 2015 and were held in Guadalajara, Mérida, Tijuana, Culiacán, Monterrey & Mexico City.

Official Housemates 
On Launch Night, host Adela Micha announced that on Day 1 (September 21, 2015), only 7 housemates (Ana, Israel, Lilian, Rossana, Shira & Sargento plus intruder Daniel) will actually enter the House that night, the other 7 official housemates (Chintro, Christopher, Danielle, Fanny, Jimena, Paito San & Taka Taka) will enter on Day 2 (September 22, 2015). The official housemates are:

Day 1's seventh and final housemate, Daniel Villareal, instead of being an actual housemate, he's the Audience Player, his stay won't be a long one, however he'll play under the audience's instructions during his stay in the house. His original place will be occupied by one of the 3 candidates. He left the House on Day 11, following Fanny's eviction and was replaced by Eduardo.

Secret Housemates 
On September 19, 2015, three potential housemates entered a "Secret Room" inside the house, and they'll stay there for the upcoming 6 days and the public will vote on Canal 5's page on which one of them will become the 15th housemate of this season.

Nomination table

Notes

: Unbeknownst to the House, Daniel is not a real Housemate and is acting as the Audience's Player. In order to hide this fact from the other Housemates, Big Brother named Daniel the Head of Household. As a result, he could not nominate or be nominated. On Day 11, the public was given the option to make the Audience's Player, Daniel a full Housemate. The alternative was to allow Eduardo, one of the secret Housemates, to become a Housemate. With 61%, Eduardo was chosen, meaning Daniel had to leave the House.
: Housemates nominated face-to-face this week. The public voted on the Big Brother App on who should be nominated this week. Ana received the most votes but was already nominated. Jimena received the next highest number of votes and now faces the public vote as well.
: Germán won the power to save someone from nominations. He chose to save Eduardo. In addition, he was allowed to nominate two additional people for eviction. He chose Israel and Martha.
: Francisco M and Eduardo was directly nominated by Big Brother for breaking a house rule.
: The public voted on the Big Brother App on who should be nominated this week. Lilian received the most votes and she was nominated.
: Andrew nominated replacing Francisco V. The singer Yuri nominated 3-Francisco V, 2-Germán, 1-Rossana replace Luís. 
: Vera nominated 3-Sandra, 2-Francisco V, 1-Eduardo replace Luís. 
: Ana and Sandra were directly nominated by Big Brother for breaking a house rule.
: At the final week, the public voted for the winner.

References

Mexico
2015 Mexican television seasons